Loveland Munson (July 21, 1843 – March 24, 1921) was a Vermont attorney, politician and judge who served as President of the Vermont State Senate and Chief Justice of the Vermont Supreme Court.

Biography
Loveland Munson was born in Manchester, Vermont on July 21, 1843.  He edited the Manchester Journal newspaper from 1863 to 1866 while studying law, was admitted to the bar in 1866, and started a practice in Manchester.

A Republican, Munson served as Manchester's Town Clerk from 1866 to 1873, and Bennington County Register of Probate from 1866 to 1876.

In 1872 and 1874 Munson was elected to the Vermont House of Representatives.  In 1878 he won election to the Vermont Senate and was chosen as that body's President Pro Tem, serving until 1880.  In 1882 Munson returned to the Vermont House, and in 1883 he was appointed as Bennington County's Judge of Probate.  In 1889 Munson was appointed to a vacancy on the Vermont Supreme Court.  He was elected to the post in 1890 and served until 1914, when he was not reappointed due to his age, and was replaced by Robert E. Healy.  His retirement lasted only a month; public outcry led the Vermont General Assembly to return Munson to the bench in January 1915 with appointment as chief justice.

While serving as a justice of the Court, Munson authored the opinion in the well-known torts case Ploof v. Putnam.  In 1904 the plaintiff, Ploof, had been sailing on Lake Champlain when a storm suddenly arose.  Fearing for the safety of his boat and passengers, he put in at Putnam's dock.  Putnam's servant untied Ploof's boat, and Ploof's family was injured and his boat damaged in the storm.  The Vermont Supreme Court held that Putnam, the dock owner, was liable for damage and injuries caused by his employee while the employee was acting on the employer's behalf.

Munson served as chief justice until 1917.  He died in Manchester on March 24, 1921, and was buried in Manchester's Dellwood Cemetery.

References 

1843 births
1921 deaths
People from Manchester, Vermont
Vermont lawyers
Republican Party members of the Vermont House of Representatives
Republican Party Vermont state senators
Presidents pro tempore of the Vermont Senate
Vermont state court judges
Justices of the Vermont Supreme Court
Chief Justices of the Vermont Supreme Court
Burials in Vermont
19th-century American lawyers